Cyproideidae is a family of amphipod crustaceans. Eighteen genera and 43 species have been described as of 2009. They mostly occur mostly in the Southern Hemisphere, where they form associations with corals, sponges, crinoids and hydroids.

Genera
The following 18 genera are included:

Austropheonoides J. L. Barnard, 1972
Cyproidea Haswell, 1879
Gbroidea Lowry & Azman, 2008
Hoplopheonoides Shoemaker, 1956
Hoplopleon K. H. Barnard, 1932
Mokuoloe J. L. Barnard, 1970
Moolapheonoides J. L. Barnard, 1974
Narapheonoides J. L. Barnard, 1972
Neocyproidea Hurley, 1955
Paracyproidea Stebbing, 1899
Peltocoxa Catta, 1875
Peltopes K. H. Barnard, 1930
Pseudopeltocoxa Schiecke, 1977
Stegoplax Sars, 1883
Terepeltopes Hirayama, 1983
Unguja Griffiths, 1976
Unyapheonoides J. L. Barnard, 1972
Victorhensenoides Rauschert, 1996

References

External links

Gammaridea
Crustacean families